The 2007 Kentucky Derby was the 133rd running of the Kentucky Derby. The race took place on May 5, 2007. The announced attendance was 156,635, the third largest in Derby history.

Elizabeth II, Queen of the United Kingdom, was a special guest of Churchill Downs and attended the race in her first visit to the United States since 1991. The Queen has stated that it was one of her dreams to attend the Kentucky Derby.

Street Sense, sent off as the 9-2 favorite on his home track, paid $11.80 as the highest-priced winning favorite in Derby history. Smarty Jones paid $10.20 to win in 2004.

Payout

The 134th Kentucky Derby Payout Schedule

 $2 Exacta: (7-8)  Paid $101.80 
 $2 Trifecta: (7-8-2)  Paid $440.00  
 $2 Superfecta (7-8-2-5) Paid $29,046.40

Full results

Kentucky Derby feature key prep races list

This list contains the current 2007 standings that leads to the Kentucky Derby race.

Subsequent Grade I wins
The foals of 2004 who raced in the 2007 Derby established themselves as a "vintage crop", both on the track and subsequently as sires. Participants in the 2008 Derby who went on to subsequent Grade I wins are as follows.
 Curlin – Horse of the Year in 2007 and 2008. 2007 Preakness Stakes, Breeders' Cup Classic, Jockey Club Gold Cup. 2008 Dubai World Cup, Stephen Foster Handicap, Woodward Stakes, Jockey Club Gold Cup
 Hard Spun – King's Bishop Stakes
 Street Sense – Travers' Stakes
 Tiago – Goodwood Stakes
 Any Given Saturday – Haskell Invitational

Subsequent breeding careers
Leading progeny of participants in the 2008 Kentucky Derby
Sires of Classic winners
Scat Daddy (18th)
 Justify – 2018 Horse of the Year. Kentucky Derby, Preakness Stakes, Belmont Stakes, Santa Anita Derby
 Lady Aurelia – 2016 Prix Morny, 2017 King's Stand Stakes
 Caravaggio – 2016 Phoenix Stakes, 2017 Commonwealth Cup
 Mendelssohn – 2017 Breeders' Cup Juvenile Turf
 Il Campione (Chi) – Chilean Horse of the Year. 2014 Premio Polla de Potrillos, Premio Nacional Ricardo Lyon, Premio El Ensayo Mega, 2015 El Derby

Curlin (3rd)
 Exaggerator – 2016 Preakness Stakes, Haskell Invitational, Santa Anita Derby. 2nd Kentucky Derby
 Palace Malice – 2013 Belmont Stakes, 2014 Metropolitan Handicap
 Good Magic – Champion 2yo colt of 2017. Breeders' Cup Juvenile. 2018 Haskell Invitational. 2nd Kentucky Derby
 Vino Rosso – 2019 Breeders' Cup Classic, Gold Cup at Santa Anita
 Stellar Wind – Champion 3yo filly of 2015. Santa Anita Oaks, 2nd in Breeders' Cup Distaff, 2016 Clement L. Hirsch and Zenyatta Stakes, 2017 Apple Blossom, Beholder Mile and Clement L. Hirsch

Hard Spun (2nd)
 Le Romain – Randwick Guineas, Cantala Stakes, BMW Stakes
 Spun to Run – Breeders' Cup Dirt Mile
 Hard Not to Like – Jenny Wiley, Gamely, Diana Stakes
 Hard Aces – Gold Cup at Santa Anita
 Questing – Coaching Club American Oaks, Alabama Stakes

Street Sense (1st)
 Hallowed Crown – 2015 Randwick Guineas, 2014 Golden Rose
 McKinzie – CashCall Futurity, Pennsylvania Derby, Malibu Stakes, Whitney Stakes. 2nd 2019 Breeders' Cup Classic
 Wedding Toast – Ogden Phipps, Beldame Stakes
 Sense of Occasion – Doomben Cup
 Sweet Reason – Spinaway, Acorn, Test Stakes

Sires of Grade/Group one winners
Any Given Saturday (8th)
 Hoppertunity – Jockey Club Gold Cup

Sources: American Classic Pedigrees, Equibase, Blood-Horse Stallion Register, Racing Post

References

2007
Kentucky Derby
Derby
May 2007 sports events in the United States